Cool In Your Code is a television show on WNYE-TV, New York City's public-access television station. The show profiles various ZIP codes in New York City with the tagline "It's the city, unzipped."  The show has won three regional Emmys.

Shortly afterward, a British version of Cool in Your Code, in a form of a TV show from the Times Online webservice, was created—like the New York counterpart, it profiles neighborhoods in London, according to their postal codes.

External links
 Cool In Your Code: New York
 Cool In Your Code facebook
 Cool In Your Code: London

References

American public access television shows
Mass media in New York City
Local mass media in London
Documentary web series
British non-fiction web series